The 2013 Asian Youth Games or AYG 2013, officially the 2nd Asian Youth Games and commonly as Nanjing 2013, were held in Nanjing, China from August 16–24, 2013. Just like the inaugural edition, the games served as a dress-rehearsal for the upcoming 2014 Summer Youth Olympics, which was also held in the same city.

Venues
 Nanjing Olympic Sports Center - Aquatics, Athletics, Squash
 Nanjing Sport Institute - Badminton
 Nanjing International Expo Center - Fencing, Weightlifting
 Wutaishan Sports Center
 Wutaishan Stadium - Football, 3x3 basketball
 Wutaishan Gymnasium - Table tennis
 Qingliangshan Sports School - Football
 Jiangning Sports Center - Football, Handball
 Zhongshan International Golf Club - Golf
 Nanjing University of Technology - Handball
 Longjiang Gymnasium - Judo, Taekwondo
 Youth Olympic Sports Park Rugby Field - Rugby sevens
 Fangshan Shooting Hall - Shooting
 Tennis Academy of China - Tennis

Mascot

The mascot for the 2013 Asian Youth Games was unveiled in Nanjing on 31 October 2012. The mascot is called Yuan Yuan, is based on the image of Eosimias sinensis, the earliest higher primate to date found in Jiangsu.

Sports
Officially, there were a total of 112 events in 16 sports, 6 more than that of the previous edition held at Singapore.

 
 Aquatics

Participating nations 
The 2013 Asian Youth Games saw 2404 athletes from all 45 competed. According to the Games' official website, Indian athletes participated the Games under the Olympic flag because the Indian Olympic Association was suspended due to political interference in December 2012.

Calendar

Medal table

References

External links

 
Asian Youth Games
Asian Youth Games
Youth sport in China
Sport in Nanjing
International sports competitions hosted by China
Asian Youth Games
Multi-sport events in China
2013 in youth sport
2013 in Asian sport
August 2013 sports events in Asia